The Church of St Peter and St Paul, Pickering is the parish church of the market town of Pickering in the county of North Yorkshire. The church sits on the top of a small hill in the centre of the town and its spire is visible across the Ryedale district. The church is part of the Church of England Diocese of York, and houses a collection of medieval wall paintings. It is a Grade I listed building.

History and architecture
The first church to stand on the current site is believed to have been built in the Anglo-Saxon era. Little is known about the first church, but remains from its construction can be seen inside the current building, including the stone font and a carved cross shaft. The church was rebuilt in c. 1140, and significant additions were made in the following decades, including a north aisle in 1150 and the south aisle in 1190. In about 1200 drastic alterations were made due to the collapse of the tower, which had until then sat in the centre of the building. The tower was replaced, but with a new structure at the west end of the church, to which the spire was later added. The chancel was enlarged in 1300, in order 'to accommodate the increasingly elaborate church services of the time', resulting in the unusual situation that the east end of the church is wider than its nave. The church features two chantry chapels, which were built to the north and south of the sanctuary: the north chantry chapel, built in 1337, originally contained the effigy of Sir William Bruce, though his remains were relocated to the chancel step in order to accommodate the present organ; the south chantry chapel, built in 1407, contains two effigies, of Sir David and Dame Margery Roucliffe, which are still in situ. The last major structural alterations were carried out in the 15th century when the walls of the nave were raised and clerestory windows added. It was onto these that the church's wall paintings were painted.

Wall paintings
Pickering Parish Church is famous for its collection of medieval wall paintings, which follow the medieval liturgical calendar. These were believed to have been commissioned in 1450, but were covered over in the next century with the Protestant Reformation. Their discovery in 1852 was an accident, caused by plaster falling from the wall. The Reverend John Ponsonby, vicar of Pickering from 1814 to 1857, disliked the paintings and insisted they be recovered, much to the frustration of the Archbishop of York at the time, Dr Thomas Musgrave. Ponsonby instructed W. H. Dykes to sketch the discoveries, but he then had the images whitewashed. However, in 1876, a new vicar, the Reverend G. H. Lightfoot, took the decision to remove the whitewash and restore the paintings. The paintings cover the majority of the nave walls, depicting scenes from the Lives of the Saints, the seven corporal acts of mercy, the Passion and the Resurrection of Christ, and also the Harrowing of Hell.

See also
 Grade I listed buildings in Ryedale

Notes

References

External links

 Pickering Parish Church (official site)
 Diocese of York (official site)
 The Pickering Frescoes

Pickering
Medieval churches
Fresco painting
Grade I listed churches in North Yorkshire
Pickering, North Yorkshire